The Liquor novel series is a novel series by Poppy Z. Brite. The books are linked by common characters and the setting, a New Orleans restaurant where "the potboiler meets the saucier".  The series revolves around the two young chefs John Rickey and Gary "G-man" Stubbs, their restaurant and their life in New Orleans.

Series titles 

 The Value of X (2002) (prequel) 
 Liquor (2004) 
 Prime (2005) 
 Soul Kitchen (2006) 

In addition, Brite calls 2007's D*U*C*K "a Liquor-related novella."

Liquor is the first novel in the series. It was released in the United States on March 16, 2004.

Soul Kitchen is the third novel in the series. It was released in the United States on July 25, 2006. It is 345 pages long.

References

External links
 Poppy Z. Brite's website

Novel series
Novels by Poppy Z. Brite
Novels set in New Orleans
Three Rivers Press books